Treasury International Capital or TIC is a set of monthly and quarterly statistical reports from the U.S. Treasury that shows nearly all the flows of money into and out of the U.S, for purchases and sales of U.S. securities and financial instruments by institutions, governments, central banks, corporations and many other entities. This includes short and long term transactions, such as stocks, bonds, derivatives, currencies, options, forwards, swaps, bank transactions, and other cross-border transactions.

References
 Treasury International Capital System (TIC) Home Page
 Investopedia article
 TIC report for October 2010

Notes

Securities (finance)
Finance in the United States